Palaemon semmelinkii is a species of shrimp of the family Palaemonidae. It can be found in mangrove forests in Asia.

References

Crustaceans described in 1881
Palaemonidae
Crustaceans of Asia
Mangrove fauna